The Ryukyu spiny rat (Tokudaia osimensis) is a species of rodent in the family Muridae.  Endemic to Amami Ōshima island in the Amami Islands of the Ryukyu archipelago of Japan, its natural habitat is subtropical moist broadleaf forest. The karyotype has an odd diploid number, 2n = 25. Like its relative T. tokunoshimensis, it has lost its Y chromosome and SRY gene.

The species is threatened by habitat destruction and fragmentation, predation by feral cats and dogs and introduced mongooses, and competition with introduced black rats.

See also
 Ellobius lutescens
 Ellobius tancrei

References

 Y-chromosome - Will it or will it not, hold on?

Rats of Asia
Endemic mammals of Japan
Endemic fauna of the Ryukyu Islands
Endangered fauna of Asia
Tokudaia
Mammals described in 1934
Taxonomy articles created by Polbot